Destruction Derby is an arcade video game released by Exidy in 1975 as the company's first driving game. Exidy licensed it to Chicago Coin, who sold the game as Demolition Derby (not to be confused with Demolition Derby, a 1984 game by Bally Midway). Exidy stopped producing Destruction Derby to avoid competing with the licensed version, and instead developed a game with similar mechanics: the controversial Death Race.

Reception
In March 1976, the first annual RePlay arcade chart listed Demolition Derby as the ninth highest-earning arcade video game of the previous year in the United States.

References

1975 video games
Arcade video games
Arcade-only video games
Discrete video arcade games
Exidy games
Racing video games
Vehicular combat games
Video games developed in the United States